Broadback Island is an island in the Ohio River in Pleasants County, West Virginia. It is opposite the city of Belmont, West Virginia. Broadback Island is a part of the Ohio River Islands National Wildlife Refuge. The island is popular with bird watchers because it serves as a good place to scan for osprey and bald eagles. Along with First Brother Island, closer to the Belmont shore, it is sometimes referred to as Second Brother Island.

See also 
List of islands of West Virginia

References

River islands of West Virginia
Islands of Pleasants County, West Virginia
Islands of the Ohio River